Necedah Shrine, officially the Queen of the Holy Rosary, Mediatrix of Peace Shrine, is a Marian shrine located in Necedah, Wisconsin. On November 12, 1949, Mary Ann Van Hoof (1909–1984) reported receiving a vision from the Blessed Virgin Mary. She claimed that in subsequent visions she was told to "bring the truth to people" through prayer and the rosary. The Roman Catholic Church investigated and found the reported visions and other phenomena indisputably faked, and when Van Hoof and her followers refused to desist, put her under interdict. Van Hoof and her followers then left the Roman Catholic Church and joined themselves to the Old Catholic movement.

Visions

Van Hoof reported that she received nine visions between November 12, 1949 and October 7, 1950, mostly in her own back yard. Pilgrims reportedly saw Van Hoof in a state of religious ecstasy. Her messages were recorded on a tape recorder, and written in long hand by at least two people. Some were repeated word for word, other paraphrased; 100,000 people attended the vision on August 15, 1950, and witness accounts vary significantly.

In 1956 Mrs. Van Hoof claimed to have been made aware of certain revelations made by the Madonna to George Washington concerning various trials his country would experience. Mrs. Van Hoof also claimed the ability to interpret these revelations.

Van Hoof said that she suffered the Passion of Our Lord on the Fridays of Advent and Lent.

Van Hoof reported that she was told in a vision that the most perfect way of offering Mass was the Tridentine Mass approved by Saint Pius V and the Council of Trent for the Latin Church. She was reportedly told that the Novus Ordo Mass, developed in the Vatican shortly after the Second Vatican Council, was watered down. Some advocates of the Tridentine Mass oppose numerous changes implemented after Vatican II.

The purported revelations also contain references to imminent chastisement, a thermonuclear World War III, Soviet submarines, and accusations that the Roman Catholic hierarchy and Papacy had been subverted.

Interdict 
After an investigation failed to support the validity of the apparitions, in 1951 John P. Treacy, Bishop of La Crosse, told the Van Hoofs to remove religious artifacts from their farm and stop circulating literature about the apparitions. In an official statement issued in 1955, he declared the visions to be false and prohibited worship associated with them. Van Hoof and her associates did not obey these orders. In May 1975, Bishop Frederick William Freking (1964–1983), Treacy's immediate successor, placed Van Hoof and six of her key followers under interdict, precipitating Van Hoof's final schism with the Roman Catholic Church.

Aftermath 
Since 1975, the shrine has continued to operate, but has disaffiliated from the Roman Catholic Church, and affiliated instead with an Old Catholic, conservative independent organization. The shrine runs a private primary school, established in 1982, and a visitor center. Believers are building a new "House of Prayer" at the spot of the visions.

Seven Sorrows of Our Sorrowful Mother's Home for Unwanted Infants - The name of the orphanage that used to be run by this community in the 1970s.

Bibliography
Cuneo, Michael. "The Vengeful Virgin: Studies in Contemporary Catholic Apocalypticism" in Millennium, Messiahs and Mayhem. Henry Robbins and Susan Palmer, editors.  New York: Routledge, 1997. 
Johnson, Kevin Orlin. Apparitions: Mystic Phenomena and What They Mean, Dallas, 1998.
Kselman, Thomas A. and Steven Avella, "Marian Piety and the Cold War in the United States," Catholic Historical Review 72 (1986): 403–424
Maloney, Marlene. "Necedah Revisited: Anatomy of a Phony Apparition" Fidelity Magazine, vol. 8, no. 3 (February 1989) pp. 18–34. ISSN 0730-0271
Swan, Henry My Work With Necedah Necedah: For My God and My Country Inc, 1959.
Van Hoof, Mary Ann and Myrtle Sommers. Revelations and Messages as Given Through Mary Ann Van Hoof at Necedah Wisconsin: Vol. 1: 1950–1970, Vol. 2: 1971–1975. Necedah: For My God and My Country Inc., 1978.
Zimdars-Swartz, Sandra. "Religious Experience and Public Cult: The Case of Mary Ann Van Hoof." Journal of Religion and Health 28 (1989): 36–57.
Zimdars-Swartz, Sandra Encountering Mary. Princeton: Princeton University Press, 1991.

References

External links

 Necedah Shrine
 Case, Thomas W. "The Tridentine Rite Conference and Its Schismatic Cousins" Originally published in Fidelity Magazine, 1993
 Joseph Dwight "My Personal Reasons Why I Left the Shrine at Necedah, Wisconsin"

Shrines to the Virgin Mary
Old Catholic church buildings in Wisconsin
Churches in Juneau County, Wisconsin